Page One is the debut album by American jazz tenor saxophonist Joe Henderson, released by Blue Note Records in 1963. Besides Henderson, the musicians for the album were trumpeter Kenny Dorham, pianist McCoy Tyner, bassist Butch Warren and drummer Pete La Roca. The album's tracks were all written by either Henderson or Dorham, and include two pieces that went on to become jazz standards: "Recorda Me" by Henderson and "Blue Bossa" by Dorham. All the musicians but Tyner are credited are on the album's front cover; Tyner is listed simply as "etc.", because he was signed to the rival Impulse! Records label.

Reception

AllMusic describes the album as a "particularly strong and historic effort". According to All About Jazz, Page One is still one of Henderson's "most critically acclaimed albums". PopMatters, by contrast, prefers later works, indicating in one review that Page One "has the careful feel of a leader’s first session". The album was identified by Scott Yanow in his Allmusic essay "Hard Bop" as one of the 17 Essential Hard Bop Recordings.

The album was released on CD in 1988 by Blue Note and has been in print consistently since then.

Track listing
All compositions by Joe Henderson except where noted.

"Blue Bossa" (Kenny Dorham) – 8:03
"La Mesha" (Kenny Dorham) – 9:10
"Homestretch" – 4:15
"Recorda Me" – 6:03
"Jinrikisha" – 7:24
"Out of the Night" – 7:23

Personnel

Joe Henderson – tenor saxophone
Kenny Dorham – trumpet
McCoy Tyner – piano
Butch Warren – bass
Pete La Roca – drums

Production
Alfred Lion – producer
Reid Miles – design, cover design
Rudy Van Gelder – engineer, remastering, digital remastering
Francis Wolff – photography, cover photo
Michael Cuscuna – CD reissue producer
Bob Blumenthal – reissue liner notes
Kenny Dorham – liner notes

References

1963 debut albums
Joe Henderson albums
Albums produced by Alfred Lion
Blue Note Records albums
Albums recorded at Van Gelder Studio